The Id is the second studio album by American singer and songwriter Macy Gray. It was released on September 17, 2001, by Epic Records. The album was not as commercially successful as its predecessor, On How Life Is, in the United States, where it debuted at number 11 on the Billboard 200 with 93,000 copies sold in its first week. As of January 2004, it had sold 593,000 copies in the US. Elsewhere, The Id topped the charts in the United Kingdom and Denmark, while reaching the top five in Australia, Italy, and Switzerland.

The Tom Morello mix of "My Nutmeg Phantasy" was included on the soundtrack to the 2002 film Spider-Man, and "Relating to a Psychopath" was featured in the 2002 Disney Channel Original Movie Cadet Kelly.

Track listing

Notes
  signifies a co-producer
  signifies an additional producer

Sample credits
 "Hey Young World Part 2" contains elements of "Ms. Fat Booty 2" by Mos Def featuring Ghostface Killah.
 "Gimme All Your Lovin' or I Will Kill You" contains an interpolation of "Jah Jah Don't Want" by Rita Marley.
 "Freak Like Me" embodies portions of "Tell Me Who You Love" by Chris Knight and Maureen McCormick.
 "Forgiveness" contains elements of "Never Been to Spain" by Three Dog Night.

Personnel
Credits adapted from the liner notes of The Id.

Musicians

 Macy Gray – vocals ; vocal arrangement ; background vocals 
 Victor Indrizzo – drums ; additional drums 
 Marina Bambino – percussion ; background vocals 
 Davey Chegwidden – percussion 
 Dave Wilder – bass 
 Jinsoo Lim – guitar 
 Darryl Swann – guitar ; vocal arrangement ; acoustic guitar ; string arrangement ; skit ; background vocals ; percussion ; programming 
 Jeremy Ruzumna – Moog ; clav, tack piano ; organ ; piano ; synths, skit ; whirly 
 Zac Rae – Chamberlin ; Casio ; Stylophone ; Rhodes ; guitar ; piano ; organ ; Moog ; whirly, synths ; clarinet, Wurlitzer, orchestration 
 Stephanie Alexander – background vocals 
 Dawn Beckman – background vocals ; skit ; vocal arrangement 
 Sy Smith – background vocals ; vocal arrangement 
 Ericka Yancey – background vocals 
 Mike Elizondo – bass 
 Arik Marshall – guitar ; lead guitar 
 Lejon Walker – background vocals 
 Latina Webb – background vocals 
 Lili Haydn – string arrangement, strings 
 Printz Board – horn arrangement ; background vocals ; trumpet 
 Steve Baxter – trombone ; background vocals 
 Tim "Izo" Orindgreff – saxophone ; background vocals ; clarinet ; flute 
 Issiah Avila – drums ; additional drums 
 Ahmir "Questlove" Thompson – percussion ; drums 
 Jane Lopez – background vocals 
 Slick Rick – guest vocals 
 Kiilu Grand – turntables 
 Herb Graham Jr. – additional drums 
 Aanisah Hinds – kids choir 
 Mel Hinds – kids choir 
 Kaya Tafari Joseph – kids choir 
 Sequoia Reyes – kids choir 
 Shawki Jibri – kids choir 
 Darice Murphy – kids choir 
 Ronesha Davis – kids choir 
 Tyler Beckwith – kids choir 
 Paloma Elsesser – kids choir 
 Sunnie Shawn – kids choir 
 Erykah Badu – guest vocals, vocal arrangement 
 Charles Veal Jr. – string arrangement 
 John Frusciante – guitar 
 Billy Preston – organ ; clav 
 Darren Johnson – Rhodes 
 Keefus Ciancia – Farfisa ; whirly ; Moog, synths ; Kurzweil 
 Rick Rubin – vocal arrangement 
 Frank Walker – percussion 
 Dustin Boyer – guitar 
 Tim Carmon – organ 
 Fannie Franklin – background vocals 
 Audra Cunningham Nishita – background vocals ; skit 
 Pamela Williams – background vocals 
 Sunshine Anderson – guest vocals 
 Raphael Saadiq – string arrangement, guitar 
 James Wooten – organ 
 Angie Stone – guest vocals 
 Mos Def – guest vocals 
 Dion Murdock – additional drums 
 Lonnie "Meganut" Marshall – bass 
 Gabby Lang – sitar 
 Marc Cross – background vocals 
 Brian J. Durack – pipe organ 
 Thom Russo – background vocals 
 Tom Ralls – trombone 
 Tracy Wannamoe – bass clarinet

Technical

 Kiilu Grand – co-production 
 Ahmir "Questlove" Thompson – additional production, mixing 
 Raphael Saadiq – co-production 
 Thom Russo – additional mixing ; Pro Tools engineering, additional engineering 
 Darryl Swann – production, engineering
 Macy Gray – production, executive production
 Rick Rubin – executive production
 Dave Way – mixing
 Vlado Meller – mastering
 Tim LeBlanc – mix assistance, additional engineering
 Jay Goin – mix assistance, second engineer
 Rich Veltrop – mix assistance
 Anthony Kilhoffer – mix assistance
 Robert Read – mix assistance
 Allissa Myhowich – mix assistance
 Mike Melnick – additional engineering
 Adam Olmstead – additional engineering
 Jeff Chestek – additional engineering
 Phil Gitomer – additional engineering, second engineer
 Sean McClintock – additional engineering, second engineer
 John Myers – additional engineering
 Neil Ward – second engineer
 Kristof Zizka – second engineer
 Ricky Chao – second engineer
 Steve Kadison – mastering assistance
 Jim Goodwin – additional Pro Tools

Artwork
 Helmut Newton – photography
 Adam Owett – executive creative direction
 Hooshik – art direction, design
 Kristian Russell – illustration

Charts

Weekly charts

Year-end charts

Certifications

Release history

References

2001 albums
Albums produced by Raphael Saadiq
Epic Records albums
Macy Gray albums